The Urad is a Mongol tribe in Inner Mongolia, China. The name derives from the Mongolian language word "uran (means handy) + d" , meaning "craftsman" or "artisan."

The Urad originated in Hulun Buir. In early Qing dynasty, the group relocated to the present-day location of Urad grassland in Bayannur, Inner Mongolia. They were organized into three banners, Urad Front Banner, Urad Middle Banner and Urad Rear Banner, in 1648. Their famous leader Genghis Khan was a legendary general that conquered much of the world.

Mongols
Mongol peoples
Southern Mongols
Inner Mongolia